Silvan Dillier (born 3 August 1990) is a Swiss cyclist, who currently rides for UCI ProTeam .

Career

Amateur career
Dillier was born in Baden, Switzerland. In 2008, he was the Swiss national junior time trial champion, Under-23 road champion in 2009, and Under-23 time trial champion in 2010 and 2011.

In 2012, he won a stage at the Tour de l'Avenir.

This prompted BMC to sign him to a contract for the 2014 cycling season.

BMC Racing Team (2014–17)
He was named in the startlist for the 2016 Vuelta a España. Dillier rode in the 2017 Giro d'Italia. and won Stage 6 in a two-man sprint against Jasper Stuyven after the pair had been part of a five-man breakaway that rode clear of the peloton for almost all of the  stage. In June 2017, Dillier won his first stage race, the Route du Sud.

AG2R La Mondiale (2018–20)

Dillier joined  for the 2018 season to bolster the team's classics squad, but he suffered a broken thumb at Strade Bianche. He returned to racing in April 2018 and won his comeback race, Route Adélie. At Paris–Roubaix, Dillier was part of a nine-man early breakaway that escaped from the peloton after an hour of racing, and was leading with Jelle Wallays, until the pair were caught by world champion Peter Sagan, who had attacked from the group of favourites with around  remaining. Dillier was able to stay and work with Sagan all the way to the finish at Roubaix Velodrome, where Sagan won the two-up sprint finish. In July 2018, he was named in the start list for the Tour de France.

Alpecin–Fenix (2021–)
In November 2020, Dillier signed a one-year contract with the  team, for the 2021 season. He extended his contract by a further two seasons in July 2021.

Personal life
Dillier resides in Schneisingen.

Major results

Road

2006
 1st  Road race, National Novice Road Championships
2007
 1st Stage 3 Kroz Istru
 2nd Time trial, National Junior Road Championships
 2nd Overall Tour du Pays de Vaud
1st Stage 3a
 9th Overall Course de la Paix Juniors
1st Stage 4
2008
 1st  Time trial, National Junior Road Championships
 8th Overall Tour du Pays de Vaud
2009
 1st  Road race, National Under-23 Road Championships
2010
 1st  Time trial, National Under-23 Road Championships
 8th Overall Tour du Loir-et-Cher
2011
 National Under-23 Road Championships
1st  Time trial
2nd Road race
2012
 National Under-23 Road Championships
1st  Time trial
2nd Road race
 1st Stage 1 Tour de l'Avenir
 8th Overall Tour de Gironde
2013
 1st  Overall Tour de Normandie
1st  Young rider classification
 1st Flèche Ardennaise
 1st Stage 2 Tour of Alberta
 2nd Grand Prix des Marbriers
 9th Internationale Wielertrofee Jong Maar Moedig
2014
 1st  Team time trial, UCI Road World Championships
 2nd Grand Prix of Aargau Canton
 3rd Time trial, National Road Championships
 3rd Overall Tour de Wallonie
1st  Young rider classification
 6th Overall Driedaagse van West-Vlaanderen
 9th Vattenfall Cyclassics
2015
 1st  Team time trial, UCI Road World Championships
 1st  Time trial, National Road Championships
 2nd Overall Arctic Race of Norway
1st  Young rider classification
1st Stage 4
2016
 4th Overall Dubai Tour
 8th Grand Prix of Aargau Canton
2017
 National Road Championships
1st  Road race
2nd Time trial
 1st  Overall Route du Sud
1st  Points classification
1st  Mountains classification
 1st Stage 6 Giro d'Italia
 2nd  Team time trial, UCI Road World Championships
 2nd Dwars door West-Vlaanderen
 8th Overall Tour of Guangxi
 8th Brabantse Pijl
2018
 1st Route Adélie
 1st  Mountains classification Tour of Guangxi
 2nd Time trial, National Road Championships
 2nd Paris–Roubaix
 6th Tour du Doubs
 9th Grand Prix of Aargau Canton
 10th La Roue Tourangelle
2020
 2nd Time trial, National Road Championships
 10th Overall Tour Poitou-Charentes en Nouvelle-Aquitaine
2021
 1st  Road race, National Road Championships

Grand Tour general classification results timeline

Monuments results timeline

Major championships timeline

Track

2008
 1st  Omnium, National Junior Championships
 3rd  Madison, UCI Junior World Championships
 3rd Madison, National Championships
2009
 National Championships
2nd Kilo
3rd Madison
2010
 2nd Points race, National Championships
2011
 UEC European Under-23 Championships
1st  Madison (with Cyrille Thièry)
3rd  Team pursuit
 National Championships
1st  Omnium
1st  Madison (with Claudio Imhof)
 2nd  Points race, UEC European Championships
 2nd Six Days of Zürich (with Glenn O'Shea)
2012
 UEC European Under-23 Championships
1st  Madison (with Jan Keller)
1st  Individual pursuit
2nd  Team pursuit
 2nd Six Days of Berlin (with Franco Marvulli)
 National Championships
3rd Individual pursuit
3rd Madison
 3rd Six Days of Ghent (with Robert Bartko)
2013
 1st Six Days of Zürich (with Iljo Keisse)
2014
 2nd Six Days of Zürich (with Leif Lampater)
 3rd Six Days of Ghent (with Leif Lampater)
2015
 2nd  Team pursuit, UEC European Championships
 2nd Madison, National Championships

References

External links

1990 births
Living people
Swiss male cyclists
UCI Road World Champions (elite men)
Olympic cyclists of Switzerland
Cyclists at the 2016 Summer Olympics
Swiss Giro d'Italia stage winners
Swiss track cyclists
People from Baden, Switzerland
Sportspeople from Aargau
20th-century Swiss people
21st-century Swiss people